SMS G41 was a 1913 Type Large Torpedo Boat (Großes Torpedoboot) of the Imperial German Navy during World War I, and the 17th ship of her class.

Construction

Built by Germaniawerft in Kiel, Germany, G41 was launched on 24 April 1915 and commissioned on 14 October 1915. The "G" in G41 refers to the shipyard at which she was constructed.

Armament consisted of three 8.8 cm SK L/45 naval guns in single mounts, together with six 50 cm (19.7 in) torpedo tubes with two fixed single tubes forward and 2 twin mounts aft. Up to 24 mines could be carried. The ship had a complement of 87 officers and men.

Service

On 24 April 1916, G41 participated in the shore bombardment of Yarmouth and Lowestoft, on the southeastern tip of Great Britain.  G41 was assigned to Scouting Division II as leader of Torpedo Boat Flotilla VI in this battle.  The overall goal of this action was to lure Royal Navy capital ships out to sea where the German fleet was massed in ambush.  A vanguard of smaller, faster vessels like G41 would be sent in as bait to bombard the English coastline and hopefully provoke a British response.  The German strike force's element of surprise was lost however when the battlecruiser Seydlitz struck a mine and had to withdraw.  The strike force nevertheless continued the mission and bombarded Yarmouth and Lowestoft killing four British civilians and wounding 19.  Four British light cruisers and 12 destroyers subsequently gave chase to the fleeing Germans but turned back upon sighting the massed German fleet.  During this action, G41 is credited with sinking a British Naval trawler, the King Stephen, rescuing her crew and taking them prisoner.

G41 took part at the Battle of Jutland on 31 May – 1 June 1916, leading the 6th Torpedo Boat Flotilla, in support of the German Battlecruisers. In total, seven torpedoes were launched, two from G41, none of which hit their targets. Later during the day, these four torpedo boats, together with the cruiser  and several other destroyers, engaged British destroyers supporting the 3rd Battlecruiser Squadron. The British destroyer  was badly damaged during this engagement. From about 20:15 CET (19:15 GMT), G41 took part in a large-scale torpedo attack on the British fleet in order to cover the outnumber German battleship's turn to west. G41 escaped further damage by retiring behind a smoke-screen.

On 22 January 1917, 11 torpedo boats of the 6th Torpedo Boat Flotilla, including G41 left Helgoland to reinforce the German torpedo forces in Flanders. The British Admiralty knew about this transfer due to codebreaking by Room 40, and ordered the Harwich Force of cruisers and destroyers to intercept the German torpedo boats. During the night of 22–23 January, the 6th Flotilla encountered three British light cruisers (and ). The Germans attempted a torpedo attack against the British cruisers, but were driven off by heavy fire and broke off the attack behind a smoke-screen. , leader of the flotilla, and the only torpedo boat to succeed in launching any torpedoes, was hit by three shells, one of which jammed her rudder, forcing her to move in a circle. G41 collided with V69 twice in the resulting confusion, with the second collision caused one of V69s torpedoes to explode. Both torpedo boats were badly damaged as a result of the collisions, and G41 was hit two more times by British shells, knocking out the ship's aft gun and forward torpedo tubes before managing to lose the chasing British cruisers in the smoke. G41 managed to reach Zeebrugge via Dutch territorial waters, while V69 made for IJmuiden in the Netherlands, where she was repaired, returning to Germany on 12 February.

G41 was in dry-dock at Ostend at the time and was seriously damaged by British shells. During 1918, the British carried out a heavy campaign of minelaying off the Flanders coast, which increasingly resulted in German torpedo boats being diverted to minesweeping to allow Flanders-based U-boats to continue operations. On 11 August, G41 set off a magnetic mine and was heavily damaged, having to be towed back to port. By October 1918, Allied advances made use of the German-occupied ports on the Flanders coast untenable, and it was decided to evacuate. G41, under repair, was unable to leave, and was scuttled in the Bruges–Ghent canal on 3 October 1918.

References

External links
 Technical specs of the Großes Torpedoboot 1913 class

Torpedo boats of the Imperial German Navy
1915 ships
Ships built in Kiel
World War I torpedo boats of Germany
Maritime incidents in 1918
Scuttled vessels